Lugal-kinishe-dudu (lugal-ki-ni-še₃-du₇-du₇) also Lugal-kiginne-dudu  (lugal-ki-gin-ne2-du₇-du₇), was a King and (ensi) of Uruk and Ur who lived towards the end of the 25th century BCE. The Sumerian King List mentions Lugal-kinishe-dudu as the second king of the dynasty after En-cakanca-ana, attributing to him a fanciful reign of 120 years.

The inscriptions of this sovereign which have been discovered show that he retained the power inherited from his predecessor, since he proclaimed himself king of Ur and Kish:

Numerous fragments are known that bear the name of Lugalkinishedudu, mainly found in Nippur, and now located in the University of Pennsylvania Museum of Archaeology and Anthropology.

The most remarkable document in which he is mentioned is a clay nail found in Girsu and commemorating the alliance which he concluded with Entemena of Lagash, the oldest known reference to a peace treaty between two kings:

He was followed by his son, Lugalkisalsi, also read Lugaltarsi.

See also

History of Sumer
Sumerian king list

References

|-

25th-century BC Sumerian kings
Kings of Kish
Kings of Ur
Kings of Uruk
Sumerian kings